The 2022 Tour de France is the 109th edition of the Tour de France. It started in Copenhagen, Denmark on 1 July and ended with the final stage at Champs-Élysées, Paris on 24 July.

Classification standings

Stage 12 
14 July 2022 – Briançon to Alpe d'Huez, 

The twelfth stage featured the race's queen stage as the riders travelled from Briançon to Alpe d'Huez. The riders gradually climbed from the get-go, passing through the intermediate sprint in Le Monêtier-les-Bains after . After descending the Galibier and the Télégraphe, the riders made their way towards the hors categorie Col de la Croix de Fer, a  climb with an average of 5.2 percent. Despite the average gradient, the climb had two short descents while the last  averaged 8.3 percent. At the top, there were  left on the stage. Following a step descent and a flat section, the riders reached the foot of the hors categorie Alpe d'Huez for another summit finish. The first  of the climb averaged almost 9 percent before easing to around 5 percent near the summit.

As soon as the stage started, Neilson Powless attacked out of the peloton. He was soon joined by five other riders as the peloton allowed the break to gain two minutes. On the climb of Col du Galibier, attacks flew out of the peloton as several riders tried to bridge to the break. Four riders, Giulio Ciccone, Louis Meintjes, Tom Pidcock, and Chris Froome, eventually managed to break away from the peloton as  began to set a steady tempo in the peloton. Meanwhile, up front, Anthony Perez left his breakaway companions to take the maximum  points at the top of the Galibier. On the descent, Powless, Ciccone, and Meintjes bridged up to Perez to form the lead group. Sebastian Schönberger, Kobe Goossens, Nelson Oliveira, Pidcock, and Froome soon made their way to the front group to establish the break of nine riders. The group extended their lead to seven and a half minutes over the peloton before  lifted the pace on Col de la Croix de Fer. On the way to the top of the climb, Oliveira, Goossens, Schönberger, and Perez were dropped from the break, with the lead quintet crossing the top of Croix de Fer at almost four and a half minutes before the peloton did so.

On the descent, the peloton eased the pace, allowing the break to extend their advantage to six and a half minutes before they reached the climb of Alpe d'Huez. With around  left, Pidcock attacked from the break. Initially, Meintjes, as well as Froome a few seconds behind him, set a steady tempo to keep Pidcock at less than ten seconds ahead but Pidcock gradually extended his lead all the way to the top. He soloed to the top to take his first World Tour win and he also became the youngest rider to win on Alpe d'Huez. Meintjes took second, 48 seconds down, while Froome finished third at over two minutes behind. Meanwhile, in the peloton,  increased the pace on the climb. The  contenders began to drop from the group until only the maillot jaune, Jonas Vingegaard, his teammate, Sepp Kuss, Tadej Pogačar, Geraint Thomas, and Enric Mas remained. Towards the top, Pogačar attacked twice and only Vingegaard was able to follow him both times. Pogačar and Vingegaard eventually slowed near the finish, allowing Thomas, Kuss, and Mas to come back to them. At the finish, Pogačar sprinted for time gaps but there were no gaps between him, Vingegaard, and Thomas.

Romain Bardet dropped to fourth after losing 19 seconds. Adam Yates, Nairo Quintana, and David Gaudu occupy fifth to seventh after having lost between 38 seconds to 1' 21". Pidcock returned to the top ten with his stage win and time gains on the stage.

Stage 13 
15 July 2022 – Le Bourg-d'Oisans to Saint-Étienne, 

The thirteenth stage featured a transition stage that took the riders from Le Bourg-d'Oisans to Saint-Étienne. From the start, the riders gradually descended towards the third-category Côte de Brié. Following the descent and a long flat section, the riders tackled the second-category Col de Parménie. Another descent and a short flat section led to the intermediate sprint in La Côte-Saint-André with  left. Near the finish, there was an uncategorised climb that peaked with  remaining. After cresting the top, the riders rode on a plateau section that led to the finish in Saint-Étienne.

There was a furious fight for the break as several riders attempted to go in the move. It took until the climb of Côte de Brié before a trio of riders, Filippo Ganna, Stefan Küng, and Matteo Jorgenson, built a gap over the peloton. Behind them, a group of 19 riders tried to bridge up to the trio but they were brought back by the -led peloton. Eventually, Hugo Houle, Fred Wright, and the  duo of Mads Pedersen and Quinn Simmons escaped from the peloton and bridged up to the trio up front. The break of seven built a lead of around two and a half minutes as the sprinters' teams kept them in check. At the intermediate sprint, after the break took maximum points, Wout van Aert led the peloton across to increase his lead in the points classification. With around  left, there was a crash that involved Caleb Ewan, hurting his knee in the process, but he continued the race. Ahead of Coté de Saint-Romain-en-Gal, the gap started to come down to the break.

On the climb, several sprinters began to drop, forcing the sprinters' teams to get off the front of the peloton. As the pace eased, the break's lead increased towards three and a half minutes. With  remaining, Simmons dropped out of the break after finishing his work for Pedersen. Eventually,  took up the chase in the peloton. They quickly decreased the break's advantage to two and a half minutes before the gap stabilised. The lead remained at less than two and a half minutes before  called off the chase. Only Wright and Houle were able to follow him, with the gap over Ganna, Küng, and Jorgenson gradually increasing towards the finish. Wright and Houle attempted to attack Pedersen in the final kilometres, but the Dane was able to respond each time. Wright and Houle never came close as Pedersen won his first Grand Tour stage. The chasing trio finished half a minute down while van Aert led the peloton across almost six minutes down. There were no changes in the top ten as Jonas Vingegaard kept the maillot jaune.

Stage 14 
16 July 2022 – Saint-Étienne to Mende, 

The fourteenth stage featured another hilly stage that took the riders from Saint-Étienne to Mende. The first  had an undulating terrain, with the riders tackling the third-category climbs of Côte de Saint-Just-Malmont and Côte de Châtaignier in the first  as well as the intermediate sprint in Yssingeaux after  of racing. Following a short flat section, the riders went up an uncategorised climb before tackling the third-category Côte de Grandrieu. Afterwards, the riders rode on a plateau section before going up the third-category Côte de la Fage, which was crested with  left. After cresting the top, there were  left until the finish at the Mende Airfield.

With the high likelihood of a breakaway challenging for the stage win, several riders attempted to make it into the break. With around  still to go, on the Côte de Saint-Just-Malmont, Tadej Pogačar attacked twice but the maillot jaune, Jonas Vingegaard, was able to respond both times. The breakaway fight continued on until the riders reached the Côte de Châtaignier with around  left when a group of 23 riders broke away from the peloton.  proceeded to block the road and allowed the break to extend their advantage to more than 14 minutes, ensuring that the break will fight for the stage win. The break continued to work well together until Michael Matthews attacked with  remaining. He built a gap over his breakaway companions, who began to attack each other as several riders tried to bridge up to Matthews. Eventually, Andreas Kron, Luis León Sánchez, and Felix Großschartner caught up to Matthews with  left. They gradually increased their lead over the chasing group, which began to split on the Côte de la Fage. The chasers struggled to work together as the lead group stabilised their gap at around half a minute.

On the descent of Côte de la Fage, Kron suffered a puncture, dropping himself from the lead group to the chase group. With the lack of cooperation in the chase group, the lead trio extended their lead to around 40 seconds ahead of the final climb of Côte de la Croix Neuve Montée Jalabert. On the climb, Matthews dropped Sánchez and Großschartner in pursuit of the stage win. In the chase group, Alberto Bettiol attacked, passing Sánchez and Großschartner before eventually catching up to Matthews. He managed to gap Matthews but the Australian gauged his effort before bridging up to Bettiol. Matthews attacked near the top, with no response from Bettiol. Matthews gradually increased his lead towards the finish to win the stage. Bettiol finished 15 seconds down while Thibaut Pinot, who made a late attack on the climb, crossed the line 34 seconds down.

Meanwhile, in the peloton,  increased the pace on Côte de la Fage to reduce the group. As they began the climb of Croix Neuve,  came to the front to set up Pogačar. Towards the top, Pogačar launched his attack, with Vingegaard immediately on his wheel. Pogačar kept his pace as they increased their lead over the other contenders. Both riders came to the finish together, 17 seconds ahead of David Gaudu, Nairo Quintana, and Geraint Thomas. The other contenders lost somewhere between 22 seconds and 1' 10". Louis Meintjes entered the top ten after gaining 11 minutes from the breakaway.

Stage 15 
17 July 2022 – Rodez to Carcassonne, 

The fifteenth stage featured a flat stage, with the riders travelling from Rodez to Carcassonne. Despite the stage being categorised as a flat stage, the terrain on the stage is undulating with several lumps scattered throughout the day. After  of rolling terrain, the riders tackled the third-category Côte d'Ambialet. After a long section of undulating terrain, the riders reached the intermediate sprint in Saint-Ferréol with  left. Immediately afterwards, the riders went up the third-category Côte des Cammazes, which was crested with  remaining. Following the climb, the riders faced another section of rolling terrain before tackling a flat section towards the finish in Carcassonne.

At the start of the stage, three riders managed to escape from the peloton: Wout van Aert, Nils Politt, and Mikkel Honoré. The trio got a lead of two minutes and although several riders tried to bridge up to them, the lead group maintained their lead at over a minute. The duo's lead stabilised at around two minutes as the sprinters' teams took up the chase in the peloton.  from the finish, Steven Kruijswijk and van Aert crashed in the peloton. Although van Aert was able to get back on his bike, Kruijswijk had a dislocated shoulder and he had to abandon the race. It was the team's second abandonment on the day as Primož Roglič did not start the stage. A few kilometres later, there was another crash involving  as the race leader, Jonas Vingegaard, and Tiesj Benoot went down; both riders would continue the race. On the climb of Côte des Cammazes,  began to increase the pace, catching Politt and Honoré and dropping sprinters such as Fabio Jakobsen, Caleb Ewan, and Dylan Groenewegen. Near the top of the climb, Benjamin Thomas and Alexis Gougeard attacked from the peloton.

Up front, Thomas and Gougeard maintained their lead at around half a minute over the peloton. With around  left, Gougeard was dropped by Thomas, who pushed on alone. Thomas continued in the lead until he was caught by the peloton inside the final kilometre.  led out the sprint, with Mads Pedersen launching with  left. Van Aert came around him but Jasper Philipsen passed his compatriot to win his first Tour stage. All of the main contenders finished safely in the peloton as Vingegaard kept the maillot jaune ahead of the last rest day.

Rest day 2 
18 July 2022 – Carcassonne

Stage 16 
19 July 2022 – Carcassonne to Foix, 

Following the last rest day, the riders headed towards the Pyrenees as the riders travelled from Carcassonne to Foix for another hilly stage. In the first , the riders tackled the fourth-category Côte de Saint-Hilaire, the third-category Col de l'Espinas, and the uncategorised climb of Col du Bac. After a short descent, the riders faced a  flat section, passing through the intermediate sprint in Lavelanet with  left. Following the long flat section, the riders went up the first-category Port de Lers, an  climb with an average of 7 percent. The climb was crested with  remaining. The descent and a short flat section took the riders to the finish in Foix.

A few kilometres following the stage's official start, a large 29-man group broke away from the peloton. The peloton allowed the break to extend their advantage to around six and a half minutes before  began to control the gap. At the first climb of the day, the Côte de Saint-Hilaire, Alexis Gougeard, Mathieu Burgaudeau, and Matteo Jorgenson managed to split themselves from the break. They led by as much as a minute over the chase group but Burgaudeau and Jorgenson soon dropped back to the chase group while Gougeard was eventually swallowed back with  left. The break soon extended their lead to over eight minutes as they neared the climb of Port de Lers. Just before the climb, Stefan Bissegger attacked from the break but he was not able to get a big gap. On the lower slopes of the climb, Damiano Caruso and Olivier Le Gac got a gap in the break, which began to split on the climb.

As the break went up the climb, Caruso dropped Le Gac out front while a group of chasers began to close the gap to the front. Michael Storer and Michael Woods soon caught up with Caruso but at the top, seven chasers caught up with the lead trio, with Simon Geschke taking maximum  points to extend his lead in the  classification. He gradually increased his lead to half a minute on the chasers, which only consisted of Jorgenson and Houle's teammate, Woods, at the top of the climb. On the final descent, Jorgenson crashed on a turn. Although he managed to come back to Woods, Houle's advantage at this point had increased to a minute. Houle maintained his lead all the way to the line to win his first Grand Tour stage.

In the  group,  continued to keep a steady pace. On the climb of Port de Lers, Enric Mas attacked with two of his teammates, building a gap of a minute over the other contenders. Towards the top, Tadej Pogačar attacked thrice, twice on the climb and once on the descent, but Vingegaard was able to get to his wheel each time, with both riders slowing down to allow the favorites group to come back. The accelerations caused Mas to be brought back and caused Romain Bardet to get into difficulty. On the descent, Bardet was able to come back to the  group. On Mur de Péguère,  set the pace before Rafał Majka set a faster tempo, thinning out the group. He continued the pace until his chain broke, prompting Sepp Kuss to take up the pacemaking. Only Pogačar, Vingegaard, and Nairo Quintana remained with Kuss at the top of the climb. On the descent, Geraint Thomas and David Gaudu came back to the maillot jaune group before they reached the finish.

Quintana and Gaudu moved up to fourth and fifth, respectively, after not losing time on the day. The  duo of Adam Yates and Tom Pidcock and Louis Meintjes lost almost a minute and a half while Mas lost almost three minutes. Bardet suffered the biggest time loss amongst the contenders as he finished three and a half minutes down. Meanwhile, Vlasov gained four minutes in the break to enter the top ten.

Stage 17 
20 July 2022 – Saint-Gaudens to Peyragudes, 

The seventeenth stage featured the shortest road stage of the Tour and the penultimate mountain stage of the Tour, with the riders travelling from Saint-Gaudens to Peyragudes. The first  were mostly flat, with the riders passing through the intermediate sprint in La Barthe-de-Neste after  of racing. A short descent to Payolle led to the foot of the second-category Hourquette d'Ancizan, an  climb with an average of 5.1 percent. The summit was crested with  left. Another descent and a short valley section led the riders to the foot of the final climb, the first-category climb to Peyragudes.

Rafał Majka, a "key lieutenant" of Pogačar did not start stage 17, due to an injury suffered after he threw his chain near the end of stage 16. There was a long breakaway fight as several riders tried to escape from the peloton. As the riders passed through the intermediate sprint, Wout van Aert took 17 points, mathematically sealing the points classification provided he finished the Tour. It took until the climb of Col d'Aspin before Thibaut Pinot and Alexey Lutsenko got a significant gap over the peloton. Towards the top, Romain Bardet attacked from the peloton. He managed to bridge up to the chasing group, which was still around half a minute behind Pinot and Lutsenko. As the riders made their way to Hourquette d'Ancizan, the lead duo maintained their advantage over the chasers while the peloton was two minutes down. On the climb, Mikkel Bjerg began to set a faster tempo in the peloton. The main victims of the pace were Adam Yates and Tom Pidcock, two  riders in the top ten, who were dropped and lost almost two minutes on the climb. Towards the top, Pinot and Lutsenko were still in the lead, increasing their gap to almost a minute on the chasing group. Meanwhile, the peloton trailed by less than a minute and a half.

Following the descent, Yates made it back to the peloton. Up front, the lead duo was caught by the chasing group as they started the penultimate climb of Col de Val Louron-Azet. With  to go, Andreas Leknessund attacked from the break, which began to split into pieces. In the  group, Bjerg took up the pacemaking again, with his pace dropping Yates once more. After a while, Brandon McNulty set the pace once Bjerg was done. His pace allowed the group to pass every remnant of the breakaway while the  contenders continued to drop throughout the climb. Towards the top, only Tadej Pogačar and the maillot jaune, Jonas Vingegaard, were able to stay with McNulty. At the top, Pogačar tried to attack Vingegaard but the Dane was immediately on his wheel. Both riders slowed down on the descent, allowing McNulty to return and set the pace again. Meanwhile, Geraint Thomas, Bardet, and Lutsenko were more than a minute down at this point while a group containing the rest of the top ten riders, with the exception of Yates and Pidcock, were more than two minutes behind.

As the leading trio went up the final climb to Peyragudes, McNulty continued to set the tempo, gradually increasing their lead over the chasers. Pogačar and Vingegaard stayed behind McNulty throughout the climb, with both riders preparing for the final ramp to the finish line. With around  left, Pogačar and Vingegaard started preparing their sprint, with Vingegaard launching first. Pogačar stayed on his wheel before passing him close to the finish, taking his third stage win of this Tour. Thomas finished over two minutes down while Bardet and Lutsenko, having been dropped by Thomas, finished a further half a minute behind. The group containing most of the other top ten contenders crossed the line around three and a half minutes down. Yates lost almost nine minutes while Pidcock fell out of  contention after losing 22 minutes.

Despite losing over two minutes to the top two, Thomas solidified his third place, having increased his advantage to around three minutes over Nairo Quintana and David Gaudu in fourth and fifth, respectively. Bardet leapt up to sixth while Yates dropped to ninth with his time loss.

Stage 18 
21 July 2022 – Lourdes to Hautacam, 

The eighteenth stage of the Tour was the final mountain stage of the races, with the riders travelling from Lourdes to a summit finish at Hautacam. The first  were mostly flat, with the riders passing through the intermediate sprint at Laruns after  of racing. Shortly afterwards, the riders climbed up the hors categorie Col d'Aubisque, a  climb with an average of 7.1 percent. After negotiating a technical descent, the riders tackled the final climb of the day, the hors categorie climb to Hautacam.

There was another furious fight for the break at the start of the stage. It took around  before a group of 33 riders got a gap from the peloton. The best-placed  rider was Enric Mas, tenth at 16' 35" down on Jonas Vingegaard. With the  classification leader, Simon Geschke, missing the break, his team kept the gap stable at around half a minute before Geschke tried to bridge on Col d'Aubisque. However, he was unable to do so and he ended up getting swallowed and dropped by the peloton. On the climb,  began to set a steady tempo, allowing the break, which began to split, to gain three and a half minutes. Towards the top, Louis Meintjes attacked from the peloton, building his advantage to around a minute and a half over the  group. Up front, Giulio Ciccone took maximum  points to close to within 3 points of Geschke's lead.

On the descent, the break split further, with Mas among those dropped. As the  group reached the Col de Spandelles, Brandon McNulty went to the front to set a faster tempo. The group thinned out before Tadej Pogačar launched his attack, but Vingegaard was immediately on his wheel. Pogačar attacked four more times, but the maillot jaune was able to follow each time. Both riders would gradually increase their advantage over the other contenders. Meanwhile, up front, only Wout van Aert, Thibaut Pinot, and Daniel Martínez were left. Van Aert took maximum  points at the top, with the remnants of the break scattered behind the lead trio. Pogačar and Vingegaard crossed the top at a minute and a half down. On the technical descent, Pogačar began to push on, with Vingegaard almost crashing at one point. On one corner, Pogačar crashed himself, getting cuts on his left leg. In a moment of sportsmanship, Vingegaard slowed down and waited for Pogačar, who got back on his bike and quickly caught up with the Dane. At the bottom of the descent, the two were caught by a group containing Meintjes, Geraint Thomas, Hugo Houle, and two of Vingegaard's teammates, Tiesj Benoot and Sepp Kuss. Up front, the lead trio entered the base of Hautacam with a lead of two and a half minutes over the maillot jaune group.

On the climb, Benoot and then Kuss began to set a furious pace in the maillot jaune group. Houle, Meintjes, and Thomas were soon dropped, leaving only Pogačar and Vingegaard with Kuss. They passed the remnants of the break before making contact with the front group with around  left. Van Aert soon set the pace as Kuss dropped. He continued to set the tempo before Pogačar was dropped with around  remaining. As van Aert finished his turn, Vingegaard soloed off the front, gradually increasing his lead over Pogačar to win the stage, his second of the Tour. By taking maximum  points at the top of Hautacam, Vingegaard also moved into the lead of the  classification. Pogačar finished second at over a minute down while van Aert held on for third, more than two minutes behind his teammate. The other contenders lost somewhere between almost three minutes and seven and a half minutes.

Thomas kept third place at exactly eight minutes down. David Gaudu rose to fourth while Nairo Quintana dropped to fifth. Alexey Lutsenko entered the top ten after finishing the stage in sixth.

Stage 19 
22 July 2022 – Castelnau-Magnoac to Cahors, 

The nineteenth stage featured a transition stage from Castelnau-Magnoac to Cahors that was expected to suit the sprinters. The entirety of the stage was mostly flat, apart from a few lumps and two fourth-category climbs in the final third of the stage. The intermediate sprint was located in Auch after  of racing. The finish of the stage was slightly uphill.

A few kilometres after the stage's official start, a five-man group consisting of Quinn Simmons, Mikkel Honoré, Nils Politt, Matej Mohorič, and Taco van der Hoorn were able to escape from the peloton. The break increased their advantage to as much as a minute and a half while the sprinters' teams controlled the gap. The race was restarted shortly after. Simmons, Mohoric, and van der Hoorn followed him while Politt sat up and went back to the peloton. The break was allowed to increase their lead to a minute again. As the break neared the top of the first fourth-category climb, Mohoric and Simmons dropped Honoré and van der Hoorn.  from the finish, Simmons dropped Mohoric as the peloton closed in on the break.

Immediately afterwards, Alexis Gougeard attacked from the peloton. Tadej Pogačar was among those who tried to bridge up to him but he was quickly marked by Wout van Aert. Gougeard was eventually joined by Fred Wright and Jasper Stuyven, with the trio building a lead of around half a minute. The sprinters' teams kept them in check, gradually reeling them in towards the finish. With the break in sight in the final , Christophe Laporte accelerated from the peloton, bridging towards the front group. In the final , as the remnants of the break were about to be caught, Laporte accelerated out front. He held his gap over the sprinters to win the stage, the first by a French rider in this Tour. Jasper Philipsen led the peloton across, one second down. There were no changes in the top ten as Jonas Vingegaard kept maillot jaune ahead of the penultimate day time trial.

Stage 20 
23 July 2022 – Lacapelle-Marival to Rocamadour, 

The penultimate stage of the Tour featured the second individual time trial of the race, with the riders tackling a  course from Lacapelle-Marival to Rocamadour. For the first , the course was mostly flat but there were also several lumps on the route. Afterwards, the riders climbed the Côte de Magès, a  climb with an average of 4.7 percent.

As is customary for time trial stages, the riders set off in the reverse order of their  placings. As a result, Caleb Ewan was the first rider down the start ramp. The first benchmark time was set by Mikkel Bjerg, who set a time of 50' 22". Shortly after he finished, the time trial world champion, Filippo Ganna, started his ride. He smashed Bjerg's time at all time checks before finishing with a time of 48' 41", almost two minutes faster than Bjerg. Ganna stayed in the hot seat for a long time as several riders tried to beat his time only to fall short each time. Eventually, Wout van Aert, the leader of the points classification, went on to challenge Ganna's time. He went faster at all three time checks before finishing with a time of 47' 59", 42 seconds faster than Ganna.

The focus soon shifted to the battle between the  contenders as there were several spots in the top ten still to be decided. For the ninth spot, Alexey Lutsenko led Adam Yates by only eight seconds, with Lutsenko recognised as the superior time trialist. Lutsenko ended up extending his advantage to almost two minutes as he finished 1' 48" faster than Yates. In the battle for the fifth spot, Nairo Quintana, Louis Meintjes, and Aleksandr Vlasov were only separated by 35 seconds. Additionally, with Meintjes finishing 2' 38" behind Romain Bardet, Bardet rose to seventh on  while Meintjes dropped to eighth place. Meanwhile, Vingegaard was slightly faster than van Aert at all time checks but he lost time towards the finish, falling short of the stage win by 19 seconds as his teammate, van Aert, won his third stage of the race.

Stage 21 
24 July 2022 – Paris La Défense Arena to Paris (Champs-Élysées), 

The final stage of the Tour featured the traditional final stage to Champs-Élysées for a final battle amongst the sprinters. Starting inside the Paris La Défense Arena, the route initially headed out of Paris, with the first  featured mostly rolling terrain, with the riders tackling one fourth-category climb. Shortly afterwards, the riders headed towards the Champs-Élysées, where they tackled eight laps of the traditional circuit. The riders passed through the intermediate sprint with  left during the third lap.

Just like in previous editions, the first part of the stage was ridden as a celebratory procession, with no riders seriously attacking before they reached the Champs-Élysées. As the riders reached the first lap of the circuit, a group of five riders went off the front. The group was composed of Stan Dewulf, Stefan Bissegger, Daniel Martínez, Jan Tratnik, and Mathieu Burgaudeau. They were soon joined by Matteo Jorgenson but the lead group was not given much of a lead and they were soon brought back with around  remaining. Shortly afterwards, another group containing Max Schachmann, the  duo of Jonas Rutsch and Owain Doull, and the  duo of Olivier Le Gac and Antoine Duchesne gained a lead of around half a minute over the peloton. The gap stabilized as the peloton kept them on a tight leash.

As the riders headed towards the final lap, the riders from the break dropped one by one until they were caught just before the riders reached the final lap. Immediately afterwards, there was an attack by Tadej Pogačar and the  pair of Geraint Thomas and Filippo Ganna, but they were not given much of a gap. Heading towards the finish, the sprinters' teams prepared their lead-out trains for the final sprint. Inside the final kilometer,  led it out at the front, with their lead sprinter, Dylan Groenewegen, launching his sprint first. He continued to lead until Jasper Philipsen went around him and went to the other side of the road to comfortably win the sprint, his second win of the Tour. Jonas Vingegaard finished together with the rest of his team to confirm his first Tour victory. Everyone else finished safely in the peloton as the jersey winners confirmed their victories in the classifications. The traditional prize-giving commenced shortly afterwards. The race had the fewest finishers since 2000, with just 135 of the 176 starters reaching the finish line in Paris.

Notes

References 

2022 Tour de France
Tour de France stages